Carlos José Kletnicki (born 13 April 1983) is an Argentine football player that currently plays for the Primera B Metropolitana club Villa Dálmine as a goalkeeper.

Club career

Gimnasia
With little chance of playing as first goalkeeper at Gimnasia y Esgrima de La Plata, where he started in the youth division, he was transferred on loan to Villa Dálmine (Primera C Metropolitana) for six months. In the second half of 2006, thanks to a good performance in a turbulent moment in Gimnasia in the 2006 Apertura Tournament, he earned the goalkeeper position displacing Juan Carlos Olave. Kletnicki was subsequently relegated to backup keeper to first Sebastián Cejas and later Gaston Sessa.

External links
 Argentine Primera statistics

1983 births
Living people
Sportspeople from Buenos Aires Province
Argentine footballers
Association football goalkeepers
Club de Gimnasia y Esgrima La Plata footballers
Unión de Santa Fe footballers
Boston River players
Deportes Concepción (Chile) footballers
Expatriate footballers in Chile
Expatriate footballers in Uruguay
Argentine people of Polish descent